Basistha (Pron: bəˈsɪsθə) temple, located in the south-east corner of Guwahati city, Assam, India, is a Shiva mandir. The history of the Basistha Ashram where the temple is located dates back to the Vedic age. According to legend the ashram was founded by the great saint Basistha (Vasishtha).

Temple in the ashram stands on the bank of the mountain streams originating from the hills of Meghalaya, which becomes the rivers Basistha and Bahini/Bharalu flowing through the city.

Basisthashram

This ashram is believed to be the home of sage Basistha. The ashram is located a few kilometers (10-12) from Guwahati, on the outskirts of Garbhanga reserve forest which has a population of elephants. This Garbhanga reserve forest is also a proposed butterfly reserve. Although the ashram has a temple but still the cave in which the Muni Vasistha is believed to have meditated is located 5 km inside the ashram. The ashram also has a waterfall.

History
The site has evidence of a stone temple which once stood at this spot around 1000-1100 CE. A brick temple was built upon the remains of the stone temple of an earlier period. It is an octagonal temple with a polygonal sikhara over it. The temple has a sunken garbhagriha which is believed to have the foot impression of the sage Vasistha, who is believed to have had his asrama in this area in the remote past. This octagonal brick temple was built by Ahom king Swargadeo Rajeswar Singha in mid 18th century.

References

Shiva temples in Assam
Hindu temples in Guwahati
Tourism in Northeast India
1764 establishments in India
Dispur